The Southern Plains woodrat (Neotoma micropus) is a species of rodent in the family Cricetidae. It is found in northwest Mexico and in Colorado, Kansas, New Mexico, Oklahoma, and Texas in the United States. The subspecies Neotoma micropus leucophaea, the White Sands woodrat, has white coloration, and is found only at White Sands National Park in New Mexico.

References

Musser, G. G. and M. D. Carleton. 2005. Superfamily Muroidea. pp. 894–1531 in Mammal Species of the World a Taxonomic and Geographic Reference. D. E. Wilson and D. M. Reeder eds. Johns Hopkins University Press, Baltimore.

Southern Plains woodrat
Mammals of Mexico
Mammals of the United States
Mammals described in 1855
Taxonomy articles created by Polbot